was a Japanese long-distance runner. He competed in the marathon at the 1924 Summer Olympics.

References

External links
 

1896 births
1953 deaths
Athletes (track and field) at the 1924 Summer Olympics
Japanese male long-distance runners
Japanese male marathon runners
Olympic athletes of Japan